Our War is a 2016 Italian-American documentary film directed by Bruno Chiaravalloti, Claudio Jampaglia and Benedetta Argentieri. It premiered out of competition at the 73rd edition of the Venice Film Festival. It tells the story of three foreign fighters joining the Kurdish forces to fight Deash.

References

External links  

2016 documentary films
American documentary films
Italian documentary films
Documentary films about the Syrian civil war
2010s English-language films
2010s American films
2010s Italian films